LegendMUD is a text-only MUD game founded by a group of friends including virtual world designer Raph Koster. It features historically significant story elements and award-winning gameplay. It opened publicly on February 14, 1994.  It has received critical praise for its research and attention to detail in reconstructing past cultures within the game context.

Game characteristics

The thematic structure of LegendMUD is based on a literal interpretation of historical legend, with content based on real locales at various points in history, but with mythological elements included as concrete reality.  LegendMUD was derived from DikuMUD.  At present, it features over 8,000 rooms contained within 60 areas.

LegendMUD features several innovations, one of which was that players were not required to select a character class such as mage or warrior.  Rather, a skill system is used, which has been noted as extensive and original.  The player selects a hometown affecting the types of skills which are then able to be learned.  For example, a character from the industrial period San Francisco has the opportunity to learn about guns, but cannot learn magic.  In contrast, a character from ancient period Ireland is capable of learning druidic skills, but can never learn about more modern ideas such as field surgery.

To further innovate on the learning of skills, the character must through interaction with non-player characters learn whatever that NPC had to teach, with some of these requiring a small form of quest.

History
In October 1995, LegendMUD was selected as The Mud Connector's Mud of the Month.

Koster wrote "", a short essay and epitaph about the death of a LegendMUD player named Karyn. An investigative journalist later disproved evidence of Karyn's death. Richard Bartle considered the incident to be a key event in the development of virtual worlds' ethics, similar to "A Rape in Cyberspace". The 'death' demonstrated that people can develop feelings for each other via the virtual world medium, thus experiencing real emotions about somebody they've never met, even an entirely fictional persona. A Story About a Tree is considered as a major counterargument against the "it's just a game" point of view on virtual worlds.  Furthermore, it showcased that while being a very real object of grief to one party, it can indeed remain just a game for another.

References

External links

 

1994 video games
MUD games
Video games developed in the United States